Alexander Boswell may refer to:
 Alexander Boswell, Lord Auchinleck (1706–1782), 8th Laird of Auchinleck, Scottish judge
 Sir Alexander Boswell, 1st Baronet, 10th Laird of Auchinleck (1775–1822), writer of traditional Scottish songs
 Alexander Boswell (British Army officer) (1928–2021), British Army officer

See also
Boswell (surname)